Aamer Khurshid (born 23 March 1967) is a Pakistani former cricketer. He played first-class and List A matches for House Building Finance Corporation and Karachi Whites between 1987 and 1994.

References

External links
 

1967 births
Living people
Pakistani cricketers
House Building Finance Corporation cricketers
Karachi Whites cricketers
Cricketers from Karachi